Choi Eun-gyeong may refer to:

Choi Eun-kyung (field hockey) (born 1971), South Korean field hockey player
Choi Eun-kyung (born 1984), South Korean short track speed skater
Choe Un-gyong (wrestler) (born 1990), North Korean sport wrestler
Choe Un-gyong (diver) (born 1994), North Korean diver